Elookkara is a small village, situated 3.6 km from Aluva, Central Kerala, 13 km from Cochin International Airport.

Isha Ayurveda provides Ayurvedic treatments at Elookkara. Isha Ayurveda is a joint venture with Arya Vaidya Pharmacy (Coimbatore) Ltd.

Elookkara 
 Country: India
 District: Ernakulam
 City: Aluva
 Taluk: Aluva
 Block: Alangad
 Village: Kadungalloor

Nearby places 
 South: Kayantikkara
 North: Kadungalloor
 East: Uliyannoor
 West: Muppathadom

Climate 
Tropical monsoon climate

References 

Villages in Ernakulam district